Brian Filipi Stadium, a.k.a. former Besëlidhja Stadium is a multi-use stadium in Lezhë, Albania.  It is currently used mostly for football matches and is the home ground of KS Besëlidhja Lezhë.  The stadium holds 5,000 people.

References

Besëlidhja
Buildings and structures in Lezhë
Besëlidhja Lezhë